Tongtian Jiaozhu (通天教主) or sometimes translated as Grandmaster of Heaven is the third disciple of Hongjun Laozu and younger brother of Yuanshi Tianzun and Taishang Laojun. He has appeared as an antagonist in many legends, classic novels, and television series. Most notably, he features in the classic Chinese novel Fengshen Yanyi, also known as The Investiture of the Gods.

Patriarch of Jie sect
Unlike Yuanshi Tianzun and Taishang Laojun, who become patriarch deities from the Chan Taoism sect. Tongtian made his own sect known as Jie Taoism sect (截教). He lived in Biyou palace on Jinsha island.

Confrontation with Chan sect
Near the end of Shang dynasty, the wicked last ruler of Shang; King Zhou of Shang was rebelled by his ex-subordinate King Wu of Zhou. At this battle most of Jie’s apprentices sided with the evil king Zhou and fought against king Wu, who was assisted by good deities from Chan Sect. As result many of Tongtian Jiaozhu disciples were killed by Chan’s disciples.

Tongtian swore to take revenge, so he led his disciples such as Jinling Shengmu (金靈聖母) and Doubao Daoren to make a deadly trap known as Zhu Xian Zhen (immortal slaughtering trap) to kill Chan’s apprentice. However this trap could be destroyed by Yuanshi Tianzun and Taishang Laojun assisted by Jieyin Daoren and Zhunti Daoren (both from the Western Paradise, or the Buddhist heaven).

Tongtian Jiaozhu then made an even more deadly trap named Wan Xian Zhen (ten thousand immortal slaughtering trap), but once again his scheme was thwarted by Chan and Buddhist followers. Finally he was arrested by his teacher Hongjun Laozu.

Another confrontation
On another occasion, Tongtian’s favourite student named Viviparus Spirit left her sect to become goddess of Chan’s Taoism. As result Tongtian Jiaozhu felt very insulted and led his disciple to attack deities of Chan’s Taoism.
However he was defeated once more by Taishang Laojun and his disciple, even though his eyes were blinded in the end of battle.

References

External links
http://www.poisonpie.com/words/others/somewhat/creation/text/outline.html. Synopsis of Fengshen Yanyi (Creation of the Gods), Tongtian Jiaozhu (Grand Master of Heaven) appeared in chapter 72, 73, 75, 77, 78, 82-84
 Wikisource:Portal:Investiture of the Gods/Chapter 72. Another Synopsis of Fengshen Yanyi which featured Grand Master of Heaven

Chinese gods
Investiture of the Gods characters